Erika Billeter (also known as Erika Gysling-Billeter, née Erika Schulze; November 8, 1927 – August 12, 2011), was a German-born Swiss art historian, curator, writer, and museum director. She was a prolific author and specialized in writing and editing art exhibition catalogues (in German and English languages). She was also known for her interests in Latin American art history.

Biography  
Erika Billeter was born in 1927 in Cologne, North Rhine-Westphalia, Germany. She attended the University of Cologne to study art history, followed by study at the University of Basel where she graduated with a PhD in 1960. She had emigrated to Switzerland in 1962, after marrying scholar . Her second marriage was to journalist .

She served as a curator at the Kunstgewerbemuseum der Stadt Zürich (later known as the Museum of Design, Zürich) from 1962 until 1968; curator at the Museum Bellerive in Zürich from 1968 to 1974; and deputy director of Kunsthaus Zürich from 1975 to 1981; then director at the Cantonal Museum of Fine Arts (Musée Cantonal des Beaux-Arts) from 1981 to 1991. While working at the Cantonal Museum of Fine Arts, Billeter focused on the display of both regional and international artists including works by Joseph Beuys, Martin Disler, Christo, Leiko Ikemura, Francesco Clemente, Eric Fischl, Rolf Iseli, among others. 

In 2000, Billeter was awarded the Bern State Prize, for her work in the service of culture.

Publications 
Billeter published more than 1,000 works, below is a list of her select works.

Author

Editor

See also 
 Women in the art history field

References 

1927 births
2011 deaths
Women art historians
German emigrants to Switzerland
20th-century German historians
German curators
Swiss curators
University of Cologne alumni
University of Basel alumni
Writers from Cologne
German women curators